The following is a list of former equipment used by the Iraqi Ground Forces. For a list of current equipment, please see List of current equipment of the Iraqi Ground Forces.

For a list of Former Iraqi Air Force equipment, please see Former Iraqi Air Force equipment.

Pre-1958 equipment

Tanks and tankettes

SPG

Аrmored cars

Cars

Trucks

Tractors

Engineering vehicles

Howitzers

AA guns

Mortars

1958–2003 equipment

Small arms

Handguns

Submachine guns

Assault rifles

Rifles

Light machine guns

General purpose machine guns

Heavy machine guns

Sniper rifles

Rocket launchers

Grenade launchers

Recoilless guns

Anti-tank missiles

Mortars

Towed artillery

Anti-tank guns

Anti-aircraft artillery

Main battle tanks

Tank destroyers

Self-propelled artillery

Forward artillery observation post

Ground surveillance radars

Ambulances

ARVs

AVLB tanks

Mortar carriers

Armoured fighting vehicles

Armoured personnel carriers

ATGM vehicles

Reconnaissance vehicles

Chemical recon car

Self-propelled anti-aircraft guns

Command vehicles

Towing vehicles

Multiple rocket launchers

MICLICs

Tactical ballistic missiles based on SCUD and Luna

Conversion rocket 5Я23, 5В27Д, 2К12, Р-15/HY-2 to surface to surface missiles

Iraqi liquid-propellant ballistic missiles

Iraqi solid-propellant ballistic missiles

Anti-ship missile

Radar systems

Cars

Motorcycles

Trucks

Truck tractors

Truck cranes

Fuel/water tankers

Mobile workshop truck

Disinfecting shower installation

Engineering vehicles

Special equipment

Other equipment

References 

 : Equipment of the Iraqi Army 1958–2003 [Special Report Vol.1]
 : Iraqi Army equipment 1930–2017 [Special Report Vo2.]

Military equipment of Iraq
Iraq
Iraq
Equipment